Carro (locally ) is a comune (municipality) at the Province of La Spezia in the Italian region Liguria, located about  southeast of Genoa and about  northwest of La Spezia.

Carro borders the following municipalities: Carrodano, Castiglione Chiavarese, Deiva Marina, Maissana, Sesta Godano, Varese Ligure.

References

Cities and towns in Liguria